SpongeBob's Greatest Hits is a first compilation album for tenth anniversary by SpongeBob SquarePants. The album was released on February 24, 2009, in conjunction with the year-long celebration of the show's tenth anniversary. The album features many songs released on previous albums, and many featured in the show.

Commercial performance
As of 6 October 2010, the album has sold 373,000 copies in the US.

Track listing
 "SpongeBob SquarePants Theme Song"
 "The Goofy Goober Song"
 "F.U.N. Song"
 "Campfire Song Song"
 "Ripped Pants"
 "Where's Gary?"
 "My Tighty Whiteys"
 "Doing the Sponge"
 "Stadium Rave"
 "Goofy Goober Rock"
 "The Best Day Ever"
 "Idiot Friends"
 "Gary's Song"
 "I Can't Keep My Eyes Off of You"
 "The Bubble Song"
 "This Grill is Not a Home”””

Re-release
The album was re-released on July 14, 2009, with the following changes in the track listing:
14. "The Bubble Song"
15. "SpongeBob SquarePants Theme Song" (performed by Cee-Lo Green)
16. "We've Got Scurvy" (performed by P!nk)
17. "Don't Be a Jerk (It's Christmas)"

Charts

References 

Greatest Hits
2009 greatest hits albums
2009 soundtrack albums
Television soundtracks